Kahnuwan is a town, development block and sub-tehsil of Gurdaspur district in the Indian state of Punjab.

History 

The town was named for Rajput king Raja Kanva.

Demographics 
Originally only Rajput lived in this town, but later people of all religions arrived.

Religion 
Kahnuwan has about 5 Hindu temples, 16 gurudwaras, three churches and five dargahs.

References 

Gurdaspur district
Cities and towns in Gurdaspur district